Boom Boom Room (Side B) is the second studio album by American band Palaye Royale. The album was released on September 28, 2018 through the record label Sumerian Records.

Track listing

Charts

References 

2018 albums
Palaye Royale albums
Sumerian Records albums